Samuel Northmore (2 March 1872 – 18 March 1946) was an English rugby union footballer who played in the 1890s. He played at representative level for England, and at club level for Millom, as a fly-half.

Playing career
Northmore won a cap for England while at Millom in 1897 against Ireland.

After Millom converted from the rugby union code to the rugby league code in 1897, Northmore was one of the players who voted to change codes and continued to play for the club. At some later date he transferred to Barrow.

References

External links
International Statistics at scrum.com
Search for "Northmore" at rugbyleagueproject.org

1872 births
England international rugby union players
English rugby union players
Millom R.L.F.C. players
People from Millom
Place of death missing
Rugby union fly-halves
Rugby union players from Cumbria
Year of death missing
Rugby league halfbacks
1946 deaths